George Buchanan (1506–1582) was a Scottish humanist.

George Buchanan may also refer to:

Sir George Buchanan (soldier) (died 1651), Scottish soldier during the Wars of the Three Kingdoms
George Buchanan (surgeon) (1827–1905), Scottish surgeon
Sir George Buchanan (physician) (1831–1895), Chief Medical Officer (UK)
Sir George Buchanan (diplomat) (1854–1924), British diplomat
 George Buchanan (engineer, born 1790) (1790–1852), Scottish civil engineer and land surveyor
Sir George Buchanan (engineer, born 1865) (1865–1940), British civil engineer
 Sir George Seaton Buchanan (1869–1936), senior medical officer of the Ministry of Health (UK) and OIHP president
George Buchanan (politician) (1890–1955), Scottish politician
George Wesley Buchanan (1921–2019), American professor of theology
George A. Buchanan (1842–1864), recipient of the Medal of Honor for actions in the American Civil War
George Duncan Buchanan (c. 1935–2012), Anglican Bishop of Johannesburg